The Gladstone Power Station is a power station at Callemondah, Gladstone, Queensland, Australia. It is Queensland's largest power station, with six coal powered steam turbines generating a maximum of 1,680 MW of electricity. Power from the station was first generated in 1976.

This fossil fuel power plant draws seawater for cooling.

History
Preliminary investigations into a new power station in Central Queensland began in 1968. The demand from expanding industry and the proximity to low cost coal were the major reasons for locating a large power station in the Gladstone area.

The Gladstone Power Station was designed and constructed by the State Electricity Commission of Queensland. A 275 kV transmission line connecting the power station to South East Queensland was to be built as well. It initially consisted of four generating sets generating 275 MW each and was to cost A$198 million. The Federal Government recognised the national importance of the power station, agreeing to contribute up to $80 million.

A September 1975 report recommended the addition of two more generating units at Gladstone. This was approved by the Queensland Government in 1976. Contracts costing $81 million were placed for this expansion.

The plant was privatised in 1994. It is currently owned by a group, including Rio Tinto Aluminium, NRG Energy and other Japanese partners.

Emissions
Carbon Monitoring for Action estimates this power station emits 11.80 million tonnes of greenhouse gases each year as a result of burning coal.

See also

List of active power stations in Queensland
Stanwell Power Station, Queensland

References

External links
Wesfarmers page on Curragh mine

Coal-fired power stations in Queensland
Gladstone, Queensland
Power stations in Queensland
Energy infrastructure completed in 1976
1976 establishments in Australia
Buildings and structures in Central Queensland
NRG Energy
Rio Tinto (corporation)